Pseudaspininae is a subfamily of the freshwater fish family Leuciscidae, which contains the true minnows. It is also known as the Far East Asian (FEA) clade of minnows. As the name suggests, all members of this family are found in East Asia.

Genera 

 Oreoleuciscus (osmans)
 Pseudaspius (redfin)
 Rhynchocypris (Eurasian minnows)
 Tribolodon

References 

Pseudaspininae
Fish subfamilies